The Afghan Ministry of Energy and Water is a ministry of the government of Afghanistan. Following the U.S. invasion of Afghanistan the ministry had the task of co-ordinating an effort to reintroduce power to areas of Afghanistan that had been cut off. Areas particularly badly affected were southern regions - Pakistan, Iran and India all agreed to supply power. On 17 June 2003 the Asian Development Bank agreed to give a loan of $50 million (USD) to the Afghan Ministry of Energy and Water. The loan would be spent over the next three years on projects for the production, distribution and transmission of electricity in Afghanistan.

Previous Ismail Khan served as Minister from 2004 – October 2013, being succeeded by Mohammad Arif Noorzai from 28 October 2013 – November 2014. On 7 September 2021 Abdul Latif Mansoor was appointed acting minister for the Islamic Emirate of Afghanistan.

See also

 Water supply in Afghanistan

References

External links 
 

Energy and Water
Afghanistan
Afghanistan
Energy in Afghanistan
Water in Afghanistan